Heiner Will (22 October 1926 – 18 October 2009) was a German athlete. He competed in the men's javelin throw at the 1956 Summer Olympics.

References

External links
 

1926 births
2009 deaths
Athletes (track and field) at the 1956 Summer Olympics
German male javelin throwers
Olympic athletes of the United Team of Germany
People from Märkisch-Oderland
Sportspeople from Brandenburg